Sant'Omero is a town and comune in the province of Teramo in the Abruzzo region of eastern Italy.

Near the town is the 10th-century church of Santa Maria a Vico.

References

Cities and towns in Abruzzo